Vladimir Michailowsky Leite Ribeiro (born 17 June 1967) is a former international butterfly and backstroke swimmer from Brazil. He participated for his native South American country at the 1988 Summer Olympics in Seoul, South Korea. There his best finish was the 32nd place in the men's 100-metre butterfly event.

References

External links 
 

1967 births
Living people
Brazilian male freestyle swimmers
Brazilian male butterfly swimmers
Brazilian male backstroke swimmers
Olympic swimmers of Brazil
Swimmers at the 1988 Summer Olympics
Sportspeople from São Paulo (state)
20th-century Brazilian people